Beware of Pity (literally The Heart's Impatience) is a 1939 novel by the Austrian writer Stefan Zweig. It was Zweig's longest work of fiction. It was adapted into a 1946 film of the same title, directed by Maurice Elvey.

Plot summary
The young lieutenant Anton Hofmiller is invited to the castle of the wealthy Hungarian Lajos Kekesfalva. He meets Kekesfalva's paralyzed daughter Edith and develops subtle affection and deep compassion for her. Edith falls in love with him. When she develops a hope for a speedy recovery, he eventually promises to marry her when she is recovered, with the hope that this will convince her to take the treatment. However, for fear of ridicule and contempt, he denies the engagement in public. When Edith learns of this, she takes her own life. Overwhelmed by guilt, he is deployed to the First World War.

In popular culture

Wes Anderson very loosely based his film The Grand Budapest Hotel (2014) on Beware of Pity and The Post Office Girl.

It was adapted to a stage play at the Barbican in 2017 directed by Simon McBurney.

The Russian movie, "Love for Love" (2013), was also based on the "Beware of Pity" but placed in a Russian setting and with an ambiguous ending. Knowing that World War I has been declared and before going to the front, the lieutenant asks for a two day leave to marry his fiancee that he had abandoned. In the last scene, he is seen riding to his crippled love as she is about to commit suicide by jumping off a balcony. She stops as she sees his return. The inspiration for the film is noted in the credits. The film, directed by Sergei Ashkenazy, is available in Russian ("Liubov' za liubov'") on YouTube.

The Danish film "Kysset" (The Kiss, 2023), is loosely based on "Beware of Pity", set in pre-WWI Denmark.

See also
 1939 in literature
 Austrian literature

References

Further reading
 Beware of Pity, review by Joan Acocella in The New York Review of Books, July 13, 2006

1939 German-language novels
Austrian novels
Austrian novels adapted into films
Novels by Stefan Zweig
Novels set in the interwar period
Novels set in Austria-Hungary
S. Fischer Verlag books